Victoria Stodden is a statistician, associate professor of information sciences, and affiliate professor of statistics at the University of Illinois at Urbana–Champaign.  She earned a B.A. in economics from the University of Ottawa, an MS in economics from the University of British Columbia, and both her law degree and a Ph.D. in statistics from Stanford University.

Work 
Stodden's work focuses on facilitating the reproducibility of research, specifically in computational sciences. She is the founder of "Reproducible Research Standard" and the website ResearchCompendia.org, which was announced in 2015 to enable public verification of research and methods but went defunct in 2016. In 2020, Stodden proposed a set of guidelines for researchers working in data science, including the role of reproducible research.

Her current focus lies in scientific research incentives, having said: "A big part of the work I am doing concerns the scientific reward structure. For example, my work on the Reproducible Research Standard is an effort to realign the intellectual property rules scientists are subject to, to be closer to our scientific norms."

Board membership 
Stodden is a co-chair for the National Science Foundation's Advisory Committee for CyberInfrastructure. She also serves on the Committee on Electronic Information and Communication of the International Mathematical Union and the Advisory Board for Project TIER (Teaching Integrity in Empirical Research).

Publications 
 "Four Simple Recommendations to Encourage Best Practices in Research Software," Jiminez et al., F1000Research 2017, 6:876 (doi: 10.12688/f1000research.11407.1), June 13, 2017.
 "Fostering Integrity in Research" Committee Members, National Academies Report, April 11, 2017.
 Privacy, Big Data, and the Public Good: Frameworks for Engagement, Lane, J., Stodden, V., Bender, S., and Nissenbaum, H. (eds). 2014.
 "Reproducibility and replicability of rodent phenotyping in preclinical studies," Kafkafi et al, bioarxiv, 2016.
 "Facilitating Reproducibility in Scientific Computing: Principles and Practice," David H. Bailey, Jonathan M. Borwein and Victoria Stodden, in Harald Atmanspacher and Sabine Maasen, eds, Reproducibility: Principles, Problems, Practices, John Wiley and Sons, New York, 2016.

References

External links 
 official page

University of Ottawa alumni
University of British Columbia alumni
Stanford University alumni
University of Illinois faculty
Women statisticians
Data scientists
Year of birth missing (living people)
Living people
Stanford Law School alumni
Berkman Fellows
American statisticians